Zuma Township is located in Rock Island County, Illinois. As of the 2010 census, its population was 757 and it contained 315 housing units.  Zuma Township was originally named Walker Township, but was renamed on October 1, 1857.

Geography

Demographics

References

External links
City-data.com
Illinois State Archives

Townships in Rock Island County, Illinois
Townships in Illinois
1857 establishments in Illinois
Populated places established in 1857